Maurizio Crozza (born 5 December 1959) is an Italian comedian, mimic, actor and television presenter.

Biography
Crozza was born in Genoa. He attended an acting school in the same city, where he graduated in 1980.

He has worked for many years with the Gialappa's Band trio on Mediaset and in the Sunday show Quelli che... il Calcio on Rai. Crozza has also starred in a number of films, including the 1995 movie Peggio di così si muore by Marcello Cesena. Over his career, he has received both praise and criticism from Italian commentators: he was notably criticised over his satire on Pope Benedict XVI in 2006 and about Silvio Berlusconi at the 2013 Sanremo Music Festival.

After hosting his own show on the network channel La7 for many years, in 2017 he moved the same show to Nove.

References

External links 
 
 Maurizio Crozza's profile on La7

Living people
1959 births
Mass media people from Genoa
Italian male actors
Italian television personalities
Italian impressionists (entertainers)
Italian male comedians